Vito Braet (born 2 November 2000) is a Belgian racing cyclist, who currently rides for UCI ProTeam .

Major results
2017
 9th E3 Harelbeke Junioren
2018
 1st Keizer der Juniores
 1st Johan Museeuw Classic
 2nd Road race, National Junior Road Championships
 4th Ronde van Vlaanderen Juniores
 5th Guido Reybrouck Classic
 10th Kuurne–Brussel–Kuurne Juniors
2019
 2nd Overall Ronde van Vlaams-Brabant
1st Stage 4 (TTT)
2021
 3rd Overall Ronde van Vlaams-Brabant
1st Stage 4
2022
 8th Cholet-Pays de la Loire
2023
 1st  Mountains classification, Étoile de Bessèges
 9th Le Samyn

References

External links

2000 births
Living people
Belgian male cyclists
People from Torhout
Cyclists from West Flanders